The Saidina Abu Bakar As Siddiq Mosque (MSABA) is a prominent mosque in Bangsar, Kuala Lumpur, Malaysia. The mosque was named after Muhammad's successor (Caliph) Abu Bakr.

History
In 1976, the people of Bangsar began to request for a mosque. It was approved by the Federal Territory Islamic Religious Council on 25 November 1977. A meeting was held by local representatives with YB Datuk Othman Abdullah on 27 November 1977.

It received RM700,000 as donations collected from the public. The government took over the project and placed it under the 3rd Malaysian 5-Year Plan. Planning for the construction of the mosque began in 1979 and completed in March 1982.

The site was officially handed over to the contractor 18 July 1980. The direction of the qiblat was consented by The Mufti of the Federal Territories, S.S. Datuk Sheikh Abdul Mohsein bin Haji Salleh on 24 August 1980. Ground levelling work started in September 1980.

The mosque was handed over officially to the government on 29 March 1982. Its official opening ceremony was officiated by the Yang di-Pertuan Agong, Sultan Ahmad Shah ibni Almarhum Sultan Abu Bakar on 15 July 1982.

Architecture and features
It was originally designed for up to 3,500 people, but after expansion work done in 2009 and 2010, it can accommodate 500 more.

The architecture is of traditional Malay mosque architecture with a minaret (43.3 m), arches, dome (16.6 m wide and 24 m from the floor), and motifs, but modern in form. It has an open concept, where air flow is allowed into the mosque as the door are made from hard wood. Islamic patterned holes are carved in between the motifs.

Its architectural designs are used in the construction for the Maldives National Mosque, as well as other prominent mosques in Kuala Lumpur such as Masjid Saidina Omar al-Khattab and Masjid Saidina Uthman ibn Affan.

Levels
The building has three levels:

Ground floor
 Class rooms for religious classes
 Office space and library
 Multipurpose hall that can accommodate up to 200 people
 Canteen
 Place for ablution and toilets

First floor
 Main praying hall for daily use by up to 1,000 people. Full capacity:  4,000 people.

Second floor
 Additional praying hall for Fridays and special occasions
 Left wing: school block comprising class rooms and school office

In the compound, there is a book shop and canteen for the public as well as for school students.

Awards
The mosque had received several awards for serving as the 'temporary' National Mosque of Malaysia during renovation works done to the National Mosque.

See also
 Islam in Malaysia

Mosques completed in 1982
Mosques in Kuala Lumpur
1982 establishments in Malaysia
Mosque buildings with domes